Palais des Sports de Gerland is an indoor sporting arena located in Lyon, France. The seating capacity of the arena is 5,910 people.

History
It was the venue of the Grand Prix de Tennis de Lyon tournament. The arena was the regular home venue of ASVEL Lyon-Villeurbanne for European Champions cup games in the late 1970s and early 1980s, for which it had a maximum capacity for 10,000 spectators.

The arena also hosted the 1968 European Champions cup final in basketball, in which Real Madrid defeated Spartak Brno 98-95 in front of 8,000 spectators. The venue also saw France defeat the United States in the 1991 Davis Cup final. The arena hosted the last Saporta Cup final in 2002, in which Montepaschi Siena won the trophy. In 2006 hosted the 2006 European Figure Skating Championships.

See also
 List of tennis stadiums by capacity

References

External links

City of Lyon website

Indoor arenas in France
Tennis venues in France
Defunct basketball venues
7th arrondissement of Lyon
Sports venues in Lyon
Buildings and structures in Lyon
1991 Davis Cup